The 12 Hours of Reims (official name: 12 Heures internationales de Reims) were a sports car endurance racing series held from 1953 to 1967 at the circuit Reims (Gueux). The start of the race was at midnight in "LeMans style" (drivers running across the track) with the cars lined up in order of their fastest practice times.

Race report 

 12 Heures Internationales - Reims
 Saturday, June 25, 1967,  Circuit Reims (France), 8.302 km
 Classes Prototypes: +2000 cc (P+2.0), 1600 cc (P1.6), 1300 cc (P1.3)
 Classes Sport, Grand Touring: +2000 cc (S+2.0), 2000 cc (S2.0), 2000 cc (GT2.0), 1300 cc (GT1.3)
 Pole Position overall:  #4 Lola T70 MK3,  Paul Hawkins, 2:07.9 - 233.68 km/h (145.20 mph)
 Fastest Lap overall:   #4 Lola T70 MK3,  Paul Hawkins, 2:10.5 - 229.02 km/h (142.30 mph)

Results Overall

Winners by class

References 

12 Hours of Reims
12 Hours of Reims